Wing Han Tsang (b. 1960), popularly known simply as Wing, is a Hong Kong-born New Zealand singer. Her singing style has drawn comparisons to Florence Foster Jenkins and Mrs. Miller. She is an example of outsider music.

Career 
Having taken up singing as a hobby after emigrating to New Zealand, Wing gained an audience by entertaining patients at nursing homes and hospitals in and around Auckland. This prompted suggestions that she release a CD; the result was a debut titled Phantom of the Opera, featuring the title song from the Andrew Lloyd Webber musical, and a selection of other popular tunes to the accompaniment of a programmed electronic keyboard.

Despite her unconventional style the recording proved a success, leading to a number of subsequent releases of cover versions that eventually gained her an international audience.

She has appeared on such shows as SportsCafe and Rove Live. She guest starred on South Park in an episode named after her that was first broadcast in March 2005. On the DVD commentary for this episode, series creators Trey Parker and Matt Stone explain that she had to approve her cartoon likeness before allowing her music to be used. Parker also says he received a letter of thanks from her for the sales boost she enjoyed as a result of the episode.

In addition to recordings, Wing has made various appearances in New Zealand, like Massey University Orientation in Wellington.

On 21 August 2007, Wing made her U.S. debut in San Francisco. Wing performed at the 2008 South by Southwest festival.

On 11 May 2008, she performed on the BBC Introducing stage at Radio 1's Big Weekend, singing versions of ABBA's "Dancing Queen" and "Mamma Mia" and Elton John's "Candle in the Wind". DJ Scott Mills, who had played Wing during his Radio 1 drivetime shows, had to personally pay to fly her over so she could sing at the festival, in Maidstone.

Wing appeared on New Zealand music TV station, C4, in June 2008 for their series Rocked The Nation, where she sang "Pokarekare Ana".

Wing toured the United States in the fall of 2009. On 25–26 October 2009, she appeared at the Birdland Jazz Club in New York City. On 2 November 2009, she performed at Rrazz Room in San Francisco.

In 2015, Wing announced that she retired from the music business via her official website.

Discography

Albums 

 Phantom of the Opera
 I Could Have Danced All Night
 The Sound of Music and the Prayer
 Wing Sings The Carpenters
 Wing Sings All Your Favourites
 Everyone Sings Carols with Wing
 Wing Sings the Songs You Love
 Beatles Classics by Wing
 Dancing Queen by Wing
 Wing Sings Elvis
 Breathe
 One Voice
 Too Much Heaven
 Wing Sings For All The Single Ladies And Raps For All The Safe Parties
 Television Radio Heroes (2012)

EPs 
 Carols – rap and sing a beautiful Christmas (5 songs)
 Beat It (4 songs)
 Stop The Nonsense (featuring Rappy McRapperson) (4 songs)
 Wing Sings More AC/DC (4 songs)

Singles 
 Wing Sings AC/DC
 Safe Computer (featuring Rappy McRapperson)
 Santa Claus on a Helicopter

References

External links 
 
 
 

1960 births
Living people
21st-century New Zealand  women singers
Hong Kong emigrants to New Zealand
Outsider musicians
New Zealand women pop singers